Neoscona chrysanthusi is a species of orb-weaver spider native to Bhutan, India and Pakistan. The specific epithet honors the Dutch arachnologist Father Chrysanthus "in token of high regard which the present authors have for him."

References 

chrysanthusi
Spiders described in 1981